Andrus Island is an island in the Sacramento-San Joaquin River Delta in Sacramento County, California, twenty kilometres northeast of Antioch. The  island is bounded on the north, and northwest by the Sacramento River, on the west, Georgiana Slough, on the southeast, Mokelumne River, and San Joaquin River, on the southwest Jackson Slough, and Seven Mile Slough.  The island is entirely within the bounds of the immense Rio Vista Gas Field, although well drilling pads and associated infrastructure make up only a small part of its land use, which is mainly agriculture. It is managed by Reclamation Districts 556, 407 and 317.

The city of Isleton is on Andrus Island.

See also
List of islands of California

References

Islands of the Sacramento–San Joaquin River Delta
Islands of Northern California
Islands of Sacramento County, California
Mokelumne River
San Joaquin River